Leanid Leanidovich Lahun (born 22 June 1978) is a Belarusian football coach and former player.

Honours
BATE Borisov
Belarusian Premier League champion: 1999

Shakhtyor Soligorsk
Belarusian Premier League champion: 2005

External links
 

1978 births
Footballers from Minsk
Living people
Belarusian footballers
Association football midfielders
Belarusian expatriate footballers
Expatriate footballers in Russia
Russian Premier League players
FC Smena Minsk players
FC Energetik-BGU Minsk players
FC BATE Borisov players
FC Torpedo Moscow players
FC Tom Tomsk players
FC SKA-Khabarovsk players
FC Shakhtyor Soligorsk players
FC Vitebsk players
FC Rudziensk players
FC Dynamo Bryansk players
Belarusian football managers
FC Torpedo Minsk managers
FC Slonim-2017 managers